The Police Services Act (R.S.O. 1990, chapter P.15) ("the Act") is the law governing the conduct of police officers in the province of Ontario, Canada. In addition to regulating the conduct of police officers, the law also established the Special Investigations Unit, a civilian oversight agency which conducts independent investigations where police actions have resulted in the death or injury of a civilian.

Enforcing the legislation is within the responsibility of the Ministry of the Solicitor General.  The Act is usually invoked in investigation or charges against police officers for disreputable conduct in accordance with s. 2(1) Police Services Act, Ontario Regulation 268/10.

History
The Act became law in 1990 to provide a legal means to define the role for all police forces in Ontario (excluding the RCMP) and to create the Special Investigations Unit. It replaced the earlier Police Act of Ontario, which was introduced in 1946, to define the role of all police forces in Ontario. Before the Police Act there were two statutes governing the role of police in the province:

 Municipal Act of Ontario, 1944 - The government decided to change the law once again in 2012 to provide more safer qualities within the government - governing smaller police forces in villages, towns and cities; it also allowed the contracting of the OPP for local policing needs
 Constables Act of Ontario, 1877 - governing  the Ontario Provincial Police and county police services (with amendments in 1922); first introduced to allow the formation of constables who provided law and order in the towns and cities of early years of Ontario (Upper Canada and Canada West).

The Act is to be eventually repealed and replaced by the Community Safety and Policing Act, 2019 (CSPA), which was passed part of the Comprehensive Ontario Police Services Act, 2019 reform bill.

See also 

 Revised Statutes of Ontario

References

External links
Police Services Act

Ontario provincial legislation
Law enforcement in Canada
1990 in Ontario
1990 in Canadian law